Du är det varmaste jag har is a 1978 Lill Lindfors studio album. In 1990, the album was re-released onto CD.

Track listing
Du är det varmaste jag har (You Are the Sunshine of My Life) - Stevie Wonder, Bo Carlgren
Rus - Peps Persson
Så vill jag bli - Björn Afzelius
Musik ska byggas utav glädje - Lill Lindfors, Björn Barlach / Åke Cato
Jag vill bli din mjuka kudde (Paint Your Pretty Picture) - Stevie Wonder, Bo Carlgren
Om du nånsin kommer fram till Samarkand - Thorstein Bergman
Vinden drar - Carl Borenius
Vad leker vi för (Between the Lines) - Stevie Wonder, Bo Carlgren
Tillsammans är ett sätt att finnas till (Better Place to Be) - Harry Chapin, Björn Barlach, Åke Cato

Contributors
Americo Belotto - trumpet
Hector Bingert - tenor saxophone
Anders Ekdahl - piano
Mats Westman - guitar
Janne Bergman - bass
Ola Brunkert - drums
with others

Charts

References 

1978 albums
Lill Lindfors albums